Matteo Rizzo (born 5 September 1998) is an Italian figure skater. He is a two-time European Championship medalist (silver in 2023, bronze in 2019), a three-time Grand Prix bronze medalist, the 2019 Winter Universiade champion, a two-time Italian national champion (2018 and 2023), and a seven-time silver national medalist (2015-2017, 2019-2022). He has won several ISU Challenger Series medals, including gold at the 2017 CS Warsaw Cup and 2022 CS Budapest Trophy. Rizzo represented Italy at the 2018 and 2022 Winter Olympics. 

He is also the 2018 World Junior bronze medalist, the 2017 JGP Italy champion, and the 2014 Italian junior national champion.

Personal life
Matteo Rizzo was born on 5 September 1998 in Rome. His parents, Brunilde Bianchi and Valter Rizzo, and sister, Francesca Rizzo, all competed in ice dancing.

Career

Early years 
Rizzo began learning to skate in 2006. He competed internationally on the novice level in the 2010–2011 and 2011–2012 seasons, winning silver at the Triglav Trophy in April 2012. His junior international debut came in September 2012 at the Ice Star event in Belarus.

2013–2014 season 
Rizzo debuted on the ISU Junior Grand Prix (JGP) series in September 2013, placing eleventh at an event in Slovakia, and won the Italian national junior title in December. In January–February 2014, making his senior international debut, he finished ninth at the Bavarian Open and fifth at the Dragon Trophy before taking the silver medal at the Hellmut Seibt Memorial. He competed at the 2014 World Junior Championships in Sofia, Bulgaria but was eliminated after placing thirtieth in the short program.

2014–2015 season 
Rizzo placed fifteenth at his sole JGP assignment in Germany. Competing on the senior level from November to December, he won silver at the Merano Cup, bronze at the Warsaw Cup – his ISU Challenger Series (CS) debut – gold at the Denkova-Staviski Cup, and silver at the Italian Championships. In January 2015, he placed fourth in Austria at the 2015 European Youth Olympic Winter Festival. His final event of the season was the 2015 World Junior Championships, held in March 2015 in Tallinn, Estonia. Rizzo qualified for the free skate by placing 20th in the short program and finished 22nd overall.

2015–2016 season 
Rizzo continued on the JGP series, placing fifth at his assignments in Austria and Spain. He earned a bronze medal at the 2015 CS Denkova-Staviski Cup and finished fifth at the 2015 CS Warsaw Cup. He reached the free skate at two ISU Championships – the 2016 Europeans in Bratislava, and the 2016 Junior Worlds in Debrecen, Hungary. He placed thirteenth at both events.

2016–2017 season 
Rizzo competed at JGP events in Germany and Spain, finishing twelfth and eighth, respectively. He placed eleventh at the 2017 World Junior Championships in Taipei and thirtieth at the 2017 World Championships in Helsinki.

2017–2018 season 
Rizzo began his season in September at two senior-level competitions. After placing fifth at the 2017 CS Lombardia Trophy with a new free skate personal best, he finished fourth at the 2017 CS Nebelhorn Trophy, qualifying Italy a spot in the men's discipline at the 2018 Winter Olympics.

In October, Rizzo competed at two JGP events. He placed second in the short program at the JGP Poland in Gdańsk, but his placement in the free skate (tenth) dropped him to sixth overall. Ranked second in the short and first in the free, he won the gold medal at JGP Italy in Egna, setting new personal bests for the short program as well as his overall score.

Returning to the senior level, Rizzo won gold at the 2017 CS Warsaw Cup, having placed first in both segments ahead of Switzerland's Stéphane Walker and Canada's Liam Firus. In December, he won the national title and was selected to represent Italy at the 2018 Winter Olympics in South Korea.  Rizzo competed in both parts of the team event as part of the Italian team, placing fifth in the short program and fourth in the free skate, while Team Italy finished fourth overall.  He finished twenty-first in the men's event.

Returning to the junior level one final time, Rizzo competed at the 2018 World Junior Championships and won the bronze medal after placing sixth in both programs.  This was the first World Junior medal for an Italian man. At the 2018 World Championships in Milan, Rizzo placed seventeenth.

2018–2019 season 
Beginning the season at the 2018 CS Lombardia Trophy, Rizzo ranked fourth in the short with a personal best score of 85.51 and fourth in the free, finishing fourth overall. He then competed at the 2018 CS Finlandia Trophy, where he finished sixth. In his Grand Prix debut event, he placed fourth at 2018 Skate America and third at 2018 NHK Trophy.  Rizzo's bronze medal at the NHK Trophy was the first Grand Prix medal for an Italian male skater.  In December, he took gold at the 2018 Denkova-Staviski Cup and the silver medal at the 2019 Italian Championships, behind Daniel Grassl.

Competing at the 2019 European Championships, Rizzo debuted a new free skate to a medley of Queen songs.  He placed tenth in the short program and third in the free skate, winning the bronze medal overall with a personal best score of 247.08 points and achieving his first podium finish at a senior-level ISU Championship. In his free skate, he successfully landed a quad toe loop for the first time.  Rizzo was the first Italian man to win a European medal since Samuel Contesti in 2009.

Rizzo next participated in the 2019 Winter Universiade in Krasnoyarsk, Russia.  Introducing the quad toe loop into the short program, he finished second there and then placed first in the free skate to win the gold medal with 273.54 points.  At the World Championships in Japan, Rizzo placed fifth in the short program with a new personal best score, tenth in the free, and seventh overall.  He concluded the season as part of Team Italy at the 2019 World Team Trophy, where he placed fourth among the men competing and Team Italy finished sixth overall.

2019–2020 season 
In the summer, Rizzo trained at the Toronto Cricket, Skating & Curling Club under Brian Orser, working to acquire more quadruple jumps for the coming season.  Rizzo began the season with two Challengers, winning bronze at the 2019 CS Lombardia Trophy and silver at the 2019 CS Ondrej Nepela Memorial.  He attempted the quad loop in competition for the first time.

For his first Grand Prix assignment, Rizzo competed at the 2019 Skate Canada International.  In the short program, he placed eighth after underrotating his quadruple toe loop and falling on his combination jump.  Despite a number of errors in the free skate, he moved up to finish in sixth place overall.  At the 2019 Cup of China, Rizzo placed third in the short program despite falling on his triple Lutz and consequently missing his combination.  Fourth in the free skate, he remained in third place overall and won the bronze medal.

After winning the silver medal at the Italian Championships, Rizzo competed at the 2020 European Championships, where he placed seventh in the short program after some minor jump errors.  Fifth in the free skate, he rose to fifth place overall but remarked that it had been "a tough season for me because it’s between the Olympics."  Rizzo was also assigned to compete at the 2020 World Championships, but these were cancelled as a result of the coronavirus pandemic.

2020–2021 season 
With pandemic-related travel restrictions in place, Rizzo made his season debut at the 2020 CS Nebelhorn Trophy, an event attended by only skaters training in Europe.  He was tipped as one of the pre-event favourites. Third after the short program, he was seventh in the free and ended up fifth overall. Following the competition, he announced that he was parting ways with longtime coach Franca Bianconi. On October 20th, Rizzo announced on Instagram that he had relocated his training base to Egna, Italy to train under coach Lorenzo Magri, alongside main domestic rival Daniel Grassl.  He was assigned to compete at the 2020 Internationaux de France, but this event was cancelled due to the pandemic.

After taking the silver medal at the Italian championships, Rizzo was assigned to compete at the 2021 World Championships in Stockholm, where he placed eleventh. Rizzo and Grassl's placements qualified two berths for Italian men at the 2022 Winter Olympics in Beijing. They were both subsequently named to the Italian team for the 2021 World Team Trophy. He announced on April 11 that he had been unable to leave Italy for the event location in Osaka, and therefore withdrew from participation. He subsequently stated that he had withdrawn after a positive COVID-19 test.

2021–2022 season 
Rizzo returned to his former coach Franca Bianconi, and also added retired pairs skater Ondřej Hotárek to his team. He made his season debut at the 2021 CS Finlandia Trophy, where he overcame a poor short program to win the free skate and place sixth overall. The following weekend he won the 2021 Budapest Trophy. 

On the Grand Prix, Rizzo's first assignment was the 2021 NHK Trophy, where he placed sixth in the short program. He was third in the free skate, rising to fifth place overall despite popping one of his two planned quad jumps. Rizzo expressed satisfaction at receiving a score over 170 points in the free segment with only one quad jump. At the 2021 Rostelecom Cup, he was ninth in the short program and rose to fifth place again after a second-place free skate.

After winning a fourth consecutive silver medal at the Italian championships, Rizzo was named to the Italian Olympic team. He was first forced to withdraw from the 2022 European Championships due to equipment issues. Competing in Beijing, Rizzo placed thirteenth in the short program of the Olympic men's event. Seventeenth in the free skate, he finished sixteenth overall.

Rizzo concluded his season at the 2022 World Championships, in a men's field considerably more open than usual due to the absences of Nathan Chen and Yuzuru Hanyu and the International Skating Union banning all Russian athletes due to their country's invasion of Ukraine. He finished tenth overall.

2022–2023 season 
Rizzo began the season on the Challenger circuit, placing fourth at the 2022 CS Lombardia Trophy before winning the 2022 CS Budapest Trophy. On the Grand Prix, he placed third in the short program at the 2022 Skate Canada International. He was fourth in the free skate but narrowly held onto third overall over Canadian Keegan Messing and won the bronze medal. Rizzo successfully landed a quad loop in his free skate and said that the result "means a lot." He said he hoped to perform a three-quad free skate later in the season. Rizzo went on to finish sixth at the 2022 NHK Trophy.

After winning his second national title, Rizzo competed at the 2023 European Championships, finishing second in the short program, 10.07 points behind segment leader Adam Siao Him Fa of France, despite underrotating his attempted quad loop. Rizzo said the experience was difficult, as for him the short program was "always like a big wall that I need to crush." In the free skate, he made an error on his opening quad toe loop attempt, but went on to land the quad loop and six triple jumps cleanly, winning a small gold medal for the free skate. He remained in second place overall, winning the silver medal. He reflected that "there were mistakes, but overall I was happy." He was the second Italian man to win multiple European medals, after Carlo Fassi.

Programs

Competitive highlights 
GP: Grand Prix; CS: Challenger Series; JGP: Junior Grand Prix

Detailed results
Small medals for short and free programs awarded only at ISU Championships. At team events, medals awarded for team results only.

References

External links 
 

1998 births
Italian male single skaters
Living people
Sportspeople from Rome
Figure skaters at the 2018 Winter Olympics
Olympic figure skaters of Italy
Figure skaters of Fiamme Azzurre
Universiade gold medalists for Italy
Universiade medalists in figure skating
Competitors at the 2019 Winter Universiade
European Figure Skating Championships medalists
World Junior Figure Skating Championships medalists
Figure skaters at the 2022 Winter Olympics